Cedar Run is a  tributary of the Occoquan River in the U.S. state of Virginia.

See also
List of rivers of Virginia

References

Rivers of Virginia
Rivers of Prince William County, Virginia